The saddled seabream (Oblada melanura), also called the saddle bream or oblade, is a species of fish of the family Sparidae. It is monotypic in the genus Oblada.

Description
It has a fuse-shaped blueish-silver body, with a black spot near the tail. The mouth is relatively small, with lower jaw being little bit in front of the upper jaw.

It is a gregarious fish, spawning in June and July. The saddled seabream is an omnivorous fish, but feeds mainly on small invertebrates.

Distribution and habitat
It is found over seagrass and rocky bottoms in the Mediterranean Sea, Bay of Biscay, Madeira, Cape Verde, Canary Islands and Strait of Gibraltar to Angola.

It can reach a size of upto 30cm, but more commonly between 5 and 20cm. Often it can be found near the surface, close to the shore.

Fishing
It is an important food fish, often sold fresh at local fish markets. It is caught in fish traps and various nets all year long. Bait in traps are various fresh and/or salted fish and fish chunks.

Saddled seabream can be hooked day and night, but much better during night. It will bait on bread, cheese, paste, fish chunks, mussels, but best results can be achieved using live bait such as live prawns.

When trolling near the shore, it is commonly caught on lures mimicking small Mediterranean sand smelts, various mullets or prawns.

Cuisine
The meat is soft and tender. Smaller specimen are often fried or used for fish soups, while larger specimen can be barbecued, grilled, or prepared as part of mixed fish stews. It can be very tasty, served with olive oil, garlic, parsley and some lemon juice.

References

External links
 
 Saddled Seabream at SeaFishingHowTo.com.
 Oblada melanura at Encyclopedia of Life.
 

Sparidae
Monotypic fish genera
Fish described in 1758
Taxa named by Carl Linnaeus
Fish of the Atlantic Ocean
Fish of the Mediterranean Sea
Fish of West Africa